Sheikh Abdul Hadi Bin Sh Othman (born 24 March 1992) is a Singaporean footballer who plays as a defender for S.League club Balestier Khalsa FC.

Personal life
Sheikh studied at Fuhua Primary School from 1999 to 2004, before going on to Jurongville Secondary School, and then Republic Polytechnic.

Club career

Gombak United
Sheikh Abdul Hadi began his professional football career with Gombak United in the S.League in 2011.

Young Lions
On the same year, he went on and sign for the Under-23 side Young Lions. At the end of 2015, Hadi left the Young Lions in search for a new club.

Balestier Khalsa
After leaving the Young Lions, Hadi sign for the Balestier Khalsa in 2016.

Career statistics 

. Caps and goals may not be correct

U23 International goals

References 

1992 births
Living people
Singaporean footballers
Association football defenders
Gombak United FC players
Young Lions FC players
Singapore Premier League players
Singaporean people of Malay descent